The 2014 Anning Open was a professional tennis tournament played on clay courts. It was the third edition for men and first edition for women, of the tournament which is part of the 2014 ATP Challenger Tour and the 2014 ITF Women's Circuit. It took place in Anning, China between 28 April and 3 May 2014.

Men's singles main-draw entrants

Seeds

Other entrants
The following players received wildcards into the singles main draw:
  Li Yuanfeng
  Liu Siyu
  Wang Ruikai
  Gong Maoxin

The following players received entry from the qualifying draw:
  Giuseppe Menga
  Aliaksandr Bury
  Wang Chuhan
  James Cluskey

Women's singles main-draw entrants

Seeds 

 1 Rankings as of 21 April 2014

Other entrants 
The following players received wildcards into the singles main draw:
  Yang Zhaoxuan
  Zhang Ying

The following players received entry from the qualifying draw:
  Nozomi Fujioka
  Riko Sawayanagi
  Wang Yan
  Zhu Lin

Men's doubles main-draw entrants

Seeds

Other entrants
The following pairs received wildcards into the doubles main draw:
  Wang Ruikai /  Wang Ruixuan
  Gong Pengxiang /  Gong Xiao
  Liu Siyu /  Wang Chuhan

Champions

Men's singles

  Alex Bolt def.  Nikola Mektić, 6–2, 7–5

Women's singles 

  Zheng Saisai def.  Jovana Jakšić 6–2, 6–3

Men's doubles

 Alex Bolt /  Andrew Whittington def.  Daniel Cox /  Gong Maoxin, 6–4, 6–3

Women's doubles 

  Han Xinyun /  Zhang Kailin def.  Varatchaya Wongteanchai /  Zhang Ling 6–4, 6–2

External links
 Official website

Anning Open
Anning Open
Kunming Open
Anning Open
Anning Open
Anning Open